Trigonulina ornata, commonly known as the "ornate verticord", is a carnivorous bivalve in the family Verticordiidae. It is native to coastal regions in the Atlantic Ocean ranging from Greenland to Brazil. It has 8-11 prominent ribs on its surface and can be a maximum of 5.6 millimeters in size.

References 

Verticordiidae